Edmund Ætheling (– possibly 1046, certainly by 1054) was a member of the royal House of Wessex as the son of Edmund Ironside, who briefly ruled as King of England between April and November 1016.  Edmund Ironside fought the Danish Vikings under Cnut the Great, but following the Danish victory at the Battle of Assandun in October, it was agreed that Ironside would rule Wessex, while Cnut took Mercia and probably Northumbria. In November 1016, Ironside died and Cnut became King of all England.

Intent on keeping his succession secure, Cnut sent Ironside's two infant sons, Edward and Edmund Ætheling, to his brother in Sweden, where they were to be murdered. Instead, the princes were spared and sent to safety to the Kingdom of Hungary, where they remained in the care of King Stephen I. After fleeing assassins hired by Cnut, the Æthelings arrived at the royal court of Kievan Rus' in 1028. The princes remained under the tutelage of Prince Yaroslav the Wise until adulthood. In 1046, the Æthelings both traveled to Hungary and helped the exiled Andrew of Hungary in his quest for the throne. Edmund died shortly after marrying a Hungarian princess, before 1054.

Birth 
Edmund was born either in 1015, 1016 or 1017. Edmund's mother was probably Ealdgyth, Edmund Ironside's wife; it is possible that she was only his stepmother, as the king's death in November 1016 left space of only one year for two children to be born. Although there is a possibility that Edmund was older than his brother, later known as Edward the Exile, it is also possible that they were twins. At the time, it was customary for posthumous sons to bear their father's name; thus, Edmund could have been the younger, posthumous son.

Life in exile 

With Edmund Ironside dead and Cnut marrying Emma of Normandy, both Edmund and Edward were deprived of their rights to succeed to the English throne. Nonetheless, both were titled "Ætheling", an Old English word which designated royal princes who were eligible for kingship. As Edmund and Edward were the rightful heirs of England, Cnut decided to have them murdered. Considering it "a disgrace" for the Ætheling to be killed on English soil, Cnut sent them to his half-brother, Olof Skötkonung, the reigning King of Sweden, where they were to be put to death. An old ally of the princes' grandfather, Æthelred the Unready, Olof instead sent the Ætheling to the Hungarian royal court of King Stephen I, fearing they were unsafe in the north, where Cnut's power was great. Although exiled, Edmund and Edward still instilled hope in the leaderless Anglo-Saxons of Danish England.

After his baptism in 985, Stephen I had become the first Christian ruler of Hungary. By the time of Edmund and Edward's arrival at his court, Stephen was married to Gisela of Bavaria and had led a peaceful reign. The Hungarian court was "a happy home" for the exiled English princes. However, in 1028, Edmund and Edward were forced to flee Hungary after Cnut sent powerful assassins to carry out the task of murdering the two Æthelings. The princes found refuge at the court of Yaroslav the Wise, Grand Prince of Kiev.

Edmund and Edward were recorded as being "somewhat grown, and had passed twelve years" when they arrived in Yaroslav's capital, Gardorika, another name for Kiev. A mid thirteenth-century letopis (chronicle) records nothing of Edmund and Edward's stay at the Kievan court, although later Russian chronicles do mention their refuge. The Anglo-Saxons were Roman Catholics and Edmund and Edward were reserved towards the Eastern Orthodox character of Kievan Christianity; Yaroslav is likely to not have allowed the Æthelings to voice their dissatisfaction. The Æthelings' presence at the Kievan court presented itself as "a very useful negotiating counter" for Yaroslav's  Western-orientated foreign policy.

After King Harthacnut's death, the English considered bringing Edmund and Edward back to England, but nothing came of it, as the princes were still in Kiev in late 1042. By 1043, Edmund, now in his late twenties, was being left out of Yaroslav's continental schemes, while Edward was elevated "to a position of sole responsibility where England's crown or dynastic alliances were concerned." This was possibly due to Edmund having an affair with a noble lady, which had caused quite a scandal. Andrew of Hungary, a Hungarian prince who had also been exiled, had established himself at Yaroslav's court in the 1030s. In 1046, during the Vata pagan uprising in Hungary, Andrew returned to his homeland with the intention of gaining the throne; Edmund and Edward are likely to have fought for Andrew's army and it is possible that they were present at his coronation.

Marriage and death
Ailred of Rievaulx, a near-contemporary chronicler, recorded Edmund's marriage to the daughter of a Hungarian king, but omitted to mention the name of the king and the name of the daughter. This could not have been a daughter of King Stephen, although a sister of King Samuel Aba, as well as any other princess of the huge Árpád dynasty is a possible candidate. It is possible that Edmund's wife was named Hedwig. Edmund died shortly after the marriage, possibly during the military campaign of Andrew of Hungary in 1046. The Crowland Psalter records that Edmund died on 10 January, but not the year; he was certainly dead by 1054, when only Edward was recalled to England by the princes' uncle, King Edward the Confessor. The king wanted to appoint his nephew as his heir, however Edward died soon after his arrival in London. With the death of Edward's son, Edgar the Ætheling (who had been proclaimed king in 1066 but was forced to swear allegiance to William the Conqueror and renounce his rights), around 1126, the male line of the House of Wessex died out. Edmund was buried in Hungary, however the exact location of his grave is unknown.

Ancestry

References

Footnotes

Notes

Bibliography

External links 

 English History (1016–66)

Anglo-Saxon royalty
Anglo-Saxon warriors
11th-century English people
1010s births
1040s deaths
House of Wessex
English expatriates in Hungary
Sons of kings